Jan Fennell, "The dog listener", is an English  dog trainer who applied the insights of Monty Roberts into horse behavior to the behavior of dogs.

Her training method is based on the theory that dogs, being descended from wolves, fit the social model of the pack - an ordered hierarchy with a clearly defined leader.  She believes that dogs are unable to understand any other social model, and when co-opted into human families as pets still see themselves as pack members.  Fennell argues that most inappropriate dog behavior arises if the owner does not consistently signal that he or she is 'pack leader'.  Theoretically this makes the dog anxious: it cannot conceive of a leaderless pack, and so if its owner abdicates leadership the dog has no option but to try to take on the 'alpha' role itself.  In the attempt it may become aggressive or difficult to handle, as it tries to assert dominance; hyperactive, through uncertainty on what it should be doing, or sometimes acutely stressed.

Other dog experts have cited recent scientific research to challenge the theory that dog behavior is based on the model of the wolf pack, criticizing this as an over-simplification.

Due to this, many of Fennell's beliefs are considered dated and archaic, no longer being scientifically accurate.

Fennell's method, called Amichien Bonding (from the French 'ami', meaning 'friend' and 'chien', meaning 'dog'), emphasizes learning the signals (in her opinion) by which dogs recognize leadership, and using them consistently so that the dog perceives the owner as 'alpha' and itself as subordinate.  It can then possibly trust its owner to take decisions and will become contented and relaxed. Fennell does not believe in physically dominating or chastising the dog.

Amichien Bonding essentially means the dog is consistently shown by the owner that the human half of the partnership is responsible for making decisions. The dog is not physically dominated, but is trained through, among other behaviors, ignoring the animal at certain times: this is done to reassure it that it is not the one responsible for leadership and decision-making.  There is dispute over whether this type of training program can have negative effects and it has been called "psychologically cruel" by one author.  Other dog trainers/owners believe it is a harmless and effective way of indicating to the dog which behaviors are acceptable and which are not.

Books
The Dog Listener
The Practical Dog Listener
A Dog's Best Friend
Friends For Life
The Seven Ages of Your Dog
The Puppy Listener

In addition to her books and DVD, Fennell had her own TV show explaining the understanding of dogs and demonstrating successful interventions, currently playing on Animal Planet on Friday nights.

References

External links
janfennellthedoglistener.com
 https://web.archive.org/web/20130325015129/http://adogs-life.co.uk/the-method/

Year of birth missing (living people)
Living people
Dog trainers
Animal care and training writers